ŽRK Ilidža is a women's handball club from Ilidža in Bosnia and Herzegovina. ŽRK Ilidža competes in the Premijer liga BiH handball league.

Honours
First League of Federation of Bosnia and Herzegovina
  Winners (1): 2021

European record

Recent seasons

The recent season-by-season performance of the club:

Key

References

External links
 Official website
 EHF Club profile

Bosnia and Herzegovina handball clubs
Ilidža